Zbehy is a village and municipality in the  Nitra District in Slovakia. Local areas like Andač and Holotka belong to the village Zbehy.

History
The village was first mentioned in a historical record in the year 1156 as Jegu. Until the 16th century it was the property of the Archdiocese of Esztergom. In the centuries afterward more Noble families and aristocratics gained property. In the year 1598 the Ottoman Empire invaded the village and burned it.

Notable people
Kálmán Tihanyi was born in the village (28 April 1897, and died 26 February 1947, Budapest). He was a Hungarian physicist, electrical engineer and inventor. One of the early pioneers of electronic television.

Geography
The village lies at an altitude of 144 metres and covers an area of 19.558 km². It has a population of about 2245 people (31.12.2011).

Ethnicity
The village is approximately 99% Slovak.

Facilities
The village has a public library a gym and football pitch.

References

External links
 
 
https://web.archive.org/web/20071116010355/http://www.statistics.sk/mosmis/eng/run.html

Villages and municipalities in Nitra District